Tough Guys Don't Dance is a 1987 crime mystery comedy-drama film written and directed by Norman Mailer based on his novel of the same name. It is a murder mystery/film noir piece. It was screened out of competition at the 1987 Cannes Film Festival.

The film received negative reviews from critics and was a box office bomb. It was also nominated for four 1988 Independent Spirit Awards.

Plot
Tim Madden (Ryan O'Neal) is a former bartender who was imprisoned for dealing cocaine, now a struggling writer prone to blackouts. On the 24th morning after the decampment of his wife Patty Lareine (Debra Sandlund), he awakens from a two-week bender to discover a tattoo reading "Madeleine" on his arm and a bloodbath in his car. He soon finds a woman's severed head in his marijuana stash in the woods, and the new Provincetown police chief Luther Regency (Wings Hauser) shacked up with his former girlfriend Madeleine (Isabella Rossellini).

Flashing back, Madden remembers the time when he encouraged Madeleine to go swinging with a Li'l Abnerish couple from down South, the fundamentalist preacher Big Stoop and his Daisy Mae-ish wife, Patty Lareine, whose ad Tim had come across in Screw magazine. On the trip back, Tim and Madeleine's car crashes due to Madeline being incensed that Tim has so enjoyed Patty Lareine's charms. The pregnant Madeleine loses her baby in the crash.

Except for his father (Lawrence Tierney), who is dying of cancer, Tim suspects everyone, including Patty Lareine, multi-millionaire prep-school pal Wardley Meeks III—and even himself—of murder. Patty Lareine had left Big Stoop, married Wardley, left him in a messy divorce that netted her a rich cash settlement, and in turn married Tim, whom she fancied. Patty Lareine disappears, and Tim goes on his fatal bender that has left his memory in shards after receiving a letter from Madeline informing him that her husband (Regency) is having an affair with his wife (Patty).

Tim remembers his assignation in the local tavern's parking lot with the blond porn star Jessica Pond, while her effete husband Lonnie Pangborn watched from the sidelines, distraught. It was Jessica's head in the Hefty bag with his grass, but soon another head turns up in his marijuana stash, that of Patty Lareine.

Tim's father helps him get rid of the heads into the bay. Regency ultimately goes crazy and is shot by Madeleine. She then uses Regency's cocaine money to buy Tim and herself a multimillion-dollar home.

Title 
The title comes from an anecdote told to Mailer by prizefighter Roger Donahue: Frank Costello, the Murder, Inc. honcho, and his girlfriend greet three champion boxers in the Stork Club. Costello demands that each, in turn, dance with the woman, and each nervously complies. The last, Willie Pep, suggests that Mr. Costello dance. Costello replies, "Tough guys don't dance."

Cast
 Ryan O'Neal as Tim Madden
 Isabella Rossellini as Madeleine Regency
 Lawrence Tierney as Dougy Madden
 Wings Hauser as Luther Regency
 Debra Sandlund as Patty Lareine
 Penn Jillette as Big Stoop
 John Bedford Lloyd as Wardley Meeks III
 Frances Fisher as Jessica Pond
 R. Patrick Sullivan as Lonnie Pangborn

Production 
The script had revisions done by scribe/script doctor Robert Towne.

Reception

Box office
The film was a box office bomb, making only , less than a fifth of its $5 million (equivalent to $ million in ) budget.

Critical reception
Tough Guys Don't Dance received negative reviews. It holds a 39% rating at Rotten Tomatoes based on 23 reviews.

Hal Hinson of The Washington Post said that the film was "hard to classify; at times you laugh raucously at what's up on the screen; at others you stare dumbly, in stunned amazement". Roger Ebert, in a  star review in the Chicago Sun-Times praised the cinematography, the Provincetown setting, and said that the relationship between Tim and Dougy was the best aspect of the film, but also had to say that "what is strange is that Tough Guys Don't Dance leaves me with such vivid memories of its times and places, its feelings and weathers, and yet leaves me so completely indifferent to its plot. Watching the film, I laughed a good deal."

However, the film had at least two supporters. Jonathan Rosenbaum of the Chicago Reader, said "Norman Mailer's best film, adapted from his worst novel, shows a surprising amount of cinematic savvy and style." Also, "He translates his high rhetoric and macho preoccupations (existential tests of bravado, good orgasms, murderous women, metaphysical cops) into an odd, campy, raunchy comedy-thriller that remains consistently watchable and unpredictable—as goofy in a way as Beyond the Valley of the Dolls. Where Russ Meyer featured women with oversize breasts, Mailer features male characters with oversize egos, and thanks to the juicy writing, hallucinatory lines such as 'Your knife is in my dog' and 'I just deep-sixed two heads' bounce off his cartoonish actors like comic-strip bubbles; even his sexism is somewhat objectified in the process." Vincent Canby of The New York Times said that the film was "not the high point of the Mailer career, but it's a small, entertaining part of it".

In the years since the film's release on video, the film has become a cult classic in bad film circles. The scene in which Tim discovers his wife is having an affair has become famous due to its melodramatic line delivery and repetition of the phrase "Oh God, oh man!" Channel 4 Film said "The overkill is strangely compelling and Mailer's disregard for taste and convention ensure his film is a massive but spectacular and unmissable folly." The film apparently got enough of a following for Metro-Goldwyn-Mayer, which owns much of Cannon's film library, to release an anamorphic widescreen DVD of the film on September 16, 2003. The disc contained an interview with Norman Mailer, a tour of Provincetown and the film's trailer. In August 2021 the film was released on Blu-ray by Cult film label Vinegar Syndrome.

Awards

Soundtrack
The CD soundtrack composed and conducted by Angelo Badalamenti is available on Music Box Records label (website).

References

External links

 
 
 
 

1987 films
1980s crime comedy-drama films
1980s mystery films
American Zoetrope films
American crime comedy-drama films
American LGBT-related films
American satirical films
Film and television memes
Films directed by Norman Mailer
Films based on American novels
Films set in Massachusetts
1987 LGBT-related films
Films shot in Massachusetts
American neo-noir films
American independent films
Golan-Globus films
Internet memes
Films with screenplays by Robert Towne
Films based on works by Norman Mailer
1980s satirical films
1987 independent films
Golden Raspberry Award winning films
Films produced by Menahem Golan
Films about writers
Films produced by Yoram Globus
1980s English-language films
1980s American films